Movistar Arena, previously known as Coliseo Cubierto El Campín, is an indoor sporting arena located in Bogotá, Colombia. It was built in 1973 and renovated in 2018. The arena holds 90 shows per year and it is the first arena ever to be built in Colombia. The maximum capacity is up to 14,000 people. Telefónica's cell phone division Movistar bought the arena's naming rights, changing its name in March 2018 for the next 20 years.

Tennis matches
Notable tennis players that have played at the arena include:
 Andre Agassi vs. Pete Sampras
 Anna Kournikova
 Karolína Plíšková
 Ashley Harkleroad
 Rafael Nadal vs. Novak Djokovic (Game played on 20 March 2011. It was a sold-out event, more than 13,000 people attended the event.)
 Roger Federer vs. Jo-Wilfried Tsonga

Renovation
On 14 January 2015 the IDRD and the Mayor of Bogota announced the coliseum would be renewed completely during 2 years. It would be a multi-event arena named Arena Sponsor Bogota which will have all the amenities needed for the best shows.

It expanded the arena to hold more than 90 shows per year and having more than 1,000,000 spectators every year.

Other events
In the arena there had been also many shows such as High School Musical The Ice Tour, and Disney on Ice. The WWE will make its debut it Colombia on 15 October 2014 with a WWE Live event at the arena, but the WWE event never happened, five years later the WWE finally made a house show in Bogota on 23 August 2019.

Concerts

See also
 Simón Bolívar Park
 Bogotá
 Corferias
 Arena Vicente Fernández Gómez

References

External links

Google Earth for Coliseo Cubierto El Campín
Info and Pictures
History Coliseo Of El Campín

Indoor arenas in Colombia
Sports venues completed in 1973
Sports venues in Bogotá
Basketball venues in Colombia
1973 establishments in Colombia
Tennis venues in Colombia